Jo Seong-joon (born 27 November 1990) is a South Korean footballer who plays as forward for Jeju United FC in K League 1.

Career
He was selected by FC Anyang in the 2013 K League draft.

References

External links 

1990 births
Living people
Association football forwards
Association football midfielders
South Korean footballers
Asan Mugunghwa FC players
FC Anyang players
Gwangju FC players
Jeju United FC players
Seongnam FC players
K League 2 players
K League 1 players